Brandizzo railway station serves the town and comune of Brandizzo, in the Piedmont region, northwestern Italy.

Since 2012 it serves line SFM2, part of the Turin metropolitan railway service.

Services

References

Railway stations in the Metropolitan City of Turin
Brandizzo